"Just to Hear You Say That You Love Me" is a song written by Diane Warren and recorded by pop singer Chynna Phillips for her solo debut album, Naked and Sacred, released in 1995. The song was released as the fourth and final single from the album, and peaked at number 64 in Australia in February 1997.

Charts

Faith Hill and Tim McGraw version

American country music singer Faith Hill recorded "Just to Hear You Say That You Love Me" as a duet with her husband Tim McGraw in 1998. It was the second single from Hill's multi-platinum 1998 album, Faith.

Critical reception
Billboard wrote, "Hill and McGraw's last vocal collaboration, "It's Your Love", spent six weeks at No. 1 on Billboard's Hot Country Singles & Tracks, and it racked up countless accolades. With the momentum they have going into this record (separately and together, their careers are on fire). this looks destined to be another big hit—and deservedly so. It's a well-written tune, and Hill delivers it with full-throated passion. When McGraw comes in, backing up his Mrs., it's easy to see why they are being called the George Jones and Tammy Wynette of their generation. This is a beautiful ballad loaded with star power, and it should push all the right buttons at radio and the cash register."

Charts

Weekly charts

Year-end charts

References

1996 singles
1998 singles
1995 songs
EMI Records singles
Faith Hill songs
Tim McGraw songs
Songs written by Diane Warren
Song recordings produced by Dann Huff
Song recordings produced by Desmond Child
Male–female vocal duets
Warner Records singles
Black-and-white music videos